"Stand By" is the debut single by British band Roman Holliday, released in 1983. It was written by Steve Lambert and R. Lambert and produced by Peter Collins. The song peaked at #61 on the UK Singles Chart. In the US, "Stand By" peaked at #54.

Charts

References

1983 debut singles
1983 songs
Roman Holliday songs
Jive Records singles